The Nubia X is an Android smartphone which was launched on 31 October 2018. 
Given the tendency in the late 2010s toward bezelless displays, instead of trimming the display with a notch or hole for housing a front camera, it opts to use two screens (on both sides of the phone). Selfies and videocalls are made with the main camera and the rear display as viewfinder.

References

Android (operating system) devices
Smartphones
Mobile phones introduced in 2018
Mobile phones with multiple rear cameras
Dual screen phone
Mobile phones with 4K video recording